Ryland Moranz (born 1986) is a Canadian folk and country singer-songwriter based in Lethbridge, Alberta, whose 2020 album XO, 1945 was a Canadian Folk Music Award nominee for Contemporary Album of the Year at the 17th Canadian Folk Music Awards in 2022.

Originally from Fort Macleod, Moranz studied music at the University of Lethbridge, and released his debut album Hello New Old World in 2016. He has toured both as a solo artist to support the album, and as a session musician in Leeroy Stagger's band.

References

External links

1986 births
Living people
Canadian folk singer-songwriters
Canadian country singer-songwriters
Musicians from Alberta
People from the Municipal District of Willow Creek No. 26
People from Lethbridge
University of Lethbridge alumni
21st-century Canadian male singers